Jens Wallays (born 15 September 1992) is a Belgian former professional racing cyclist, who rode professionally for  between 2015 and 2017. He is the brother and nephew of racing cyclists Jelle Wallays and Luc Wallays, the latter of whom coached Jelle and Jens.

Major results
2013
 1st  Road race, National Under–23 Road Championships
2014
 1st La Côte Picarde
2015
 8th Dwars door de Vlaamse Ardennen

References

External links
 
 
 

1992 births
Living people
Belgian male cyclists
Place of birth missing (living people)
21st-century Belgian people